Oryidae is a monophyletic family of soil centipedes belonging to the superfamily Himantarioidea. Centipedes in this family are found in tropical and subtropical regions of the Americas, Africa, Madagascar, south Asia, Australia, and some Pacific islands. The number of leg-bearing segments in this family varies within species and ranges from 53 to 169. These centipedes are very elongated with a high mean number of trunk segments (often greater than 100) and great variability in this number within species. This family contains the following genera:

 Aspidopleres
 Chamberlinia
 Ctenorya
 Diphtherogaster
 Endoptelus
 Heniorya
 Lamotteophilus
 Marshallopus
 Metaxythus
 Notiphilides
 Nycternyssa
 Orphnaeus
 Orya
 Parorya
 Pentorya
 Stenorya
 Titanophilus
 Trematorya

References

Centipede families
Geophilomorpha